John Newcombe and Tony Roche were the defending champions and won in the final 6–4, 6–3 against Mark Edmondson and John Marks.

Seeds

  Fred McNair /  Raúl Ramírez (first round)
  John Alexander /  Phil Dent (first round)
  Syd Ball /  Allan Stone (first round)
  Colin Dibley /  Kim Warwick (semifinals)

Draw

External links
1978 Custom Credit Australian Indoor Championships Doubles Draw

Doubles